Below is a list of flag bearers who have represented Malaysia at the Olympics.

Flag bearers carry the national flag of their country at the opening ceremony of the Olympic Games.

See also
Malaysia at the Olympics

References

Malaysia at the Olympics
Malaysia
Olympic flagbearers
Olympic flagbearers